Neal Arden (born 	Arthur Neal Aiston; 27 December 1909 – 4 June 2014) was an English-born actor and writer who appeared in films, television shows, theatre productions and radio programs. He was born in Fulham, London.

In 1928, Arden moved to Southern Rhodesia and served in the British South Africa Police (BSAP). Two years later, he returned to Great Britain to pursue an acting career. His screen debut came in the 1934 film version of Princess Charming. Other films include "Pimpernel" Smith, John Wesley and The Shakedown. He also worked in television, appearing in series like Ivanhoe and Z-Cars. Arden's most notable role was on the BBC radio show Housewives' Choice, as a host for 20 years from 1946. His last acting credit was in 1977.

Later life
Arden also wrote plays and songs. In 2005, he published his autobiography called A Man of Many Parts. In 2003 he retired to East Anglia with his wife Julia. Arden died on 4 June 2014.

Filmography

References

External links
 

1909 births
2014 deaths
Male actors from London
English centenarians
British South Africa Police officers
English male film actors
English male stage actors
English male television actors
English male radio actors
Men centenarians
People from Fulham
20th-century English male actors
Alumni of RADA
British expatriates in Southern Rhodesia